Experiment is a 1943 Czech drama film directed by Martin Frič.

Cast
 Zdeněk Štěpánek as MUDr. Svatopluk Slaba
 Vlasta Matulová as Julka Zachová
 Vítezslav Vejrazka as Slaba's Nephew Jindrich
 Otomar Korbelář as Painter Karel Chodovský
 Ella Nollová as Holovská
 Anna Hlavácková-Vávrová as MUDr. Dunovská
 Marie Blazková as Slaba's Housekeeper
 Vera Hanslíková as Jindrich's lover
 Marie Buresová as Singer
 Olga Augustová as Singing-Mistress
 Vladimír Repa as Guest at the Vernissage
 František Filipovský as Guest at the Vernissage
 Bolek Prchal as Servant in Slaba's sanatorium

References

External links
 

1943 films
1943 drama films
1940s Czech-language films
Czechoslovak black-and-white films
Films directed by Martin Frič
Czech drama films
1940s Czech films